Metal Master or Metal Masters may refer to:

Chad Collyer (also known as "Metal Master" or "The Metal Master"), an American professional wrestler and stage musician
Beyblade: Metal Masters, the second season of Beyblade: Metal Fusion
Metal Masters, a 1993 fighting game released for the Nintendo Game Boy, Atari ST, and the Amiga
Metal Master (comics), a fictional character in the Marvel Universe

See also
Direct metal mastering, an analogue audio disc mastering technique
Metal Mass, a heavy metal music service of worship